Helena Bukowska-Szlekys (2 March 1899 – 2 May 1954) was a Polish sculptor. Her work was part of the sculpture event in the art competition at the 1948 Summer Olympics.

References

1899 births
1954 deaths
20th-century Polish sculptors
20th-century Polish women artists
Polish women sculptors
Olympic competitors in art competitions
People from Siberia